The Lutheran Church of the Ascension is a historic Lutheran church in Savannah, Georgia, located in the Savannah Historic District. The congregation was founded by Johann Martin Boltzius in 1741, with the current building constructed in 1843.

History 
On April 14, 1741, the congregation was organized by Johann Martin Boltzius, who was the pastor for the Salzburger emigrants in Ebenezer, Georgia. In 1756, the congregation purchased the land where the current building stands, adjacent to Wright Square. In 1772, the congregation purchased a former wooden courthouse building, which they had moved to the site. This building would be the first Lutheran church building in the city. In 1774, noted Lutheran pastor Henry Muhlenberg preached to a congregation of about 200 in the building.

The current building was built in 1843, with major remodeling occurring between 1875 and 1879. This building features a large stained glass window depicting the ascension of Jesus. During the American Civil War, the church served as a field hospital, and Union soldiers occupied the building.

See also 

 National Register of Historic Places listings in Chatham County, Georgia

References

Bibliography

External links 
 
 

1843 establishments in Georgia (U.S. state)
Churches completed in 1843
Churches in Savannah, Georgia
Evangelical Lutheran Church in America
Historic district contributing properties in Georgia (U.S. state)
Lutheran churches in Georgia (U.S. state)
18th-century Lutheran churches in the United States
Savannah Historic District